Joseph Flack (December 5, 1894 – May 8, 1955) was an American diplomat who served as ambassador to Bolivia, Costa Rica, and Poland.

He was born in Grenoble, Pennsylvania, the son of Roland Flack and Sallie R. Walter Flack.

References

External links

1894 births
1955 deaths
Ambassadors of the United States to Costa Rica
Ambassadors of the United States to Bolivia
Ambassadors of the United States to Poland
People from Bucks County, Pennsylvania
United States Foreign Service personnel